Ubajay is a village and municipality in Entre Ríos Province in north-eastern Argentina. Formerly known as Pueblo Palmar and Colonia Palmar Yatay, it is a pioneer of Jewish immigration. It was promoted by the Jewish Colonization Association, a philanthropic entity created by Baron Maurice de Hirsch. On January 5, 1915, the Ubajay Station of the Argentine Northeast Railway was inaugurated, a date that is taken as foundational. The railway symbolized, at the beginning of the 20th century, as a vital artery of Argentine national production, between the Northwest and Mesopotamia, where migratory currents from Europe bet on the hope of development and progress.

Origin of Name
Its name comes from the Guarani language, and it refers to the fruit tree Hexachlamys edulis, which are abundant in the region.

References

Jewish Argentine settlements
Populated places in Entre Ríos Province